The women's 200 metres at the 2018 IAAF World U20 Championships was held at Ratina Stadium on 13 and 14 July.

Records

Results

Heats
Qualification: First 4 of each heat (Q) and the 4 fastest times (q) qualified for the semifinals.

Wind:Heat 1: -0.1 m/s, Heat 2: +1.1 m/s, Heat 3: +0.9 m/s, Heat 4: +0.2 m/s, Heat 5: +0.7 m/s

Semifinals
Qualification: First 2 of each heat (Q) and the 2 fastest times (q) qualified for the final.

Wind:Heat 1: -0.5 m/s, Heat 2: -0.1 m/s, Heat 3: +0.2 m/s

Final

Wind: -0.1 m/s

References

200 metres
200 metres at the World Athletics U20 Championships